The Patterson Distinguished Service Medal is awarded by the Meteorological Service of Canada (MSC) to residents of Canada for services rendered to meteorology. The award was created in honor of Mr. John Patterson, a meteorologist who served as director and controller of the MSC from 1929 to 1946, an important period in his development.

The Patterson Medal was awarded for the first time in 1954 to its namesake after enough funds have been collected. It is considered the most important award for the recognition of exceptional work done in meteorology by Canadians. This is not a distinction of the Canadian Meteorological and Oceanographic Society, but it is customary to announce its award during the Canadian Meteorological Congress.

Winners
The medal was presented to John Patterson in 1954. Due to lack of funds, a 7-year hiatus occurred before the next attribution in 1961 when the SMC committed to fund the award. Since then, it has been awarded annually. The winners are:

See also

 List of meteorology awards

References

Meteorology awards
Canadian science and technology awards